The Naustdal Tunnel is a road tunnel connecting the municipalities of Kinn and Sunnfjord in Vestland county, Norway.

Work on the tunnel began in 1993 to replace the old road that went over the mountains.  The tunnel was opened on 18 August 1995.  Originally, there was a toll station at the northern end of the tunnel which operated from 1995 until 2010.  The toll station was closed permanently after collecting  to pay off the debt.

References

Kinn
Sunnfjord
Road tunnels in Vestland